In mathematics, the nilpotent cone  of a finite-dimensional semisimple Lie algebra  is the set of elements that act nilpotently in all representations of   In other words,  

Example

References
 .
 .

Lie algebras